The 7-Dorpenomloop Aalburg (also known as the Rabobank 7-Dorpenomloop van Aalburg due to sponsorship reasons and the Dorpenomloop Wijk en Aalburg) was an elite women's road bicycle race held in and around Aalburg, the Netherlands. From 2011, the race was rated by the Union Cycliste Internationale (UCI) as a 1.2 category race. The race ended after its 2018 edition, due to financial issues.

Past winners

References

External links 
 
 Archived official website
 

 
2007 establishments in the Netherlands
2018 disestablishments in the Netherlands
Cycle races in the Netherlands
Cycling in Altena, North Brabant
Recurring sporting events established in 2007
Recurring sporting events disestablished in 2018
Women's road bicycle races